Allancastria deyrollei is a butterfly belonging to the family Papilionidae. It was described by Oberthür in 1869. It is found only in western Iran, Turkey, Syria, northwestern Iraq, Lebanon, Jordan, and Israel.

References
Carbonell, F., 1996. Contribution à la connaissance du genre Allancastria Bryk (1934): Morphologie, biologie et écologie d’Allancastria cretica (Rebel, 1904) (Lepidoptera: Papilionidae). Linneana Belgica 15: 303-308.
Carbonell, F., Karbalaye, A., 1998. Contribution à la connaissance des genres Allancastria Bryk, 1934 et Archon Hübner, 1822 en Iran (Lepidoptera: Papilionidae). Linneana Belgica 16: 245-248.
De Freina, J.J., 1979. Zur kenntnis der Gattung Allancastria unter Berücksichtigung der Arten A. cerisyi und A. deyrollei (Lepidoptera: Papilionidae). Entomologische Zeitschrift 89: 129-142.
De Freina, J.J., 1987. Bemerkungen zur Biologie, Verbreitung und Systematik kleinasiatischer Papilioniden (Lepidoptera: Papilionidae). Atalanta (Würzburg) 17: 205-208.
Eisner, C., 1974. Parnassiana Nova XLIX. Die Arten und Unterarten der Baroniidae, Teinopalpidae und Parnassiidae (Erster teil) (Lepidoptera). Zoologische Verhandelingen Uitgegeven door het Rijksmuseum van Natuurlijke Historie te Leiden, 135: 1-96. PDF
Hensle, J., 1993. Beobachtungen bei westanatolischen Osterluzeifaltern (Lepidoptera: Papilionidae). Nachrichten entomologische Vereins Apollo Frankfurt/Main, 14: 289-299.
Larsen, T.B., 1973. Two species of Allancastria (Lepidoptera: Papilionidae) in Lebanon. Entomologist 106: 145-152.
Nardelli, U., 1993. Bemerkungen zur Zucht einiger Zerynthiini und Parnassiini (Lepidoptera: Papilionidae). Entomologische Zeitschrift 103: 213-228.
Nazari, V., 2003. Butterflies of Iran. Dayereye-Sabz Publications, Tehran.

External links
Tree of Life, Allancastria deyrollei

Papilionidae
Butterflies of Asia
Butterflies described in 1869
Taxa named by Charles Oberthür